Government Higher Secondary School Maloth Kasba is an Educational Institution located near Sanjos junction (Parambha junction) in Malom town of Kasaragod district of Kerala, India. It is one of the biggest schools in Kasaragod district in terms of the number of students. It is situated at Vallikkadavu, nearly 2 km from Malom City Center. The majority of children in the village attend the school. Buses traveling between Malom, Konnakkad  and Cherupuzha pass through the School premises. The majority of students are below the poverty line, SC/ST and other vulnerable sections of the society. Shermi Ulahannan is an alumna who is noteworthy for winning the Women's Kabaddi gold in Asiad in China.C.V. Balakrishnan a Malayalam writer had worked as a teacher in the school.

References 

Schools in Kasaragod district
High schools and secondary schools in Kerala